Kavli Foundation may refer to:

Kavli Trust (Norwegian: Kavlifondet), a Norwegian foundation that owns Kavli Holding AS
Kavli Foundation (United States), an American foundation established in 2000

See also
Kavli (disambiguation)